The Bank Notes (Ireland) Act 1864 is an Act of the Parliament of the United Kingdom which allowed bank notes to be impressed using machinery and to be taken as "taken to be good and valid to all intents and purposes".

United Kingdom Acts of Parliament 1864
Financial regulation in the United Kingdom
Currency law in the United Kingdom